Latvia competed at the 1992 Winter Olympics in Albertville, France. It was the first time since 1936 that the nation had competed as an independent nation at the Winter Olympic Games.  Latvian athletes competed for the Soviet Union from 1956 to 1988.

Competitors
The following is the list of number of competitors in the Games.

Biathlon

Men

Men's 4 × 7.5 km relay

 1 A penalty loop of 150 metres had to be skied per missed target.
 2 One minute added per missed target.

Bobsleigh

Cross-country skiing

Men

 1 Starting delay based on 10 km results. 
 C = Classical style, F = Freestyle

Figure skating

Men

Women

Freestyle skiing

Men

Luge

Men

(Men's) Doubles

Women

References

External links
Official Olympic Reports
 Olympic Winter Games 1992, full results by sports-reference.com

Nations at the 1992 Winter Olympics
1992
1992 in Latvian sport